Papa Murphy's is a take-and-bake pizza company based in Vancouver, Washington. It began in 1995 as the merger of two local take-and-bake pizza companies: Papa Aldo's Pizza (founded in 1981) and Murphy's Pizza (founded in 1984). The company and its franchisees operate more than 1,300 outlets in the United States, Canada and the United Arab Emirates. Papa Murphy's is the fifth-largest pizza chain in the United States. On April 2019, it was announced that the company would be acquired by MTY Food Group for $190 million.

History
The chain of pizzerias traces its history back to 1981, when the Papa Aldo's Pizza chain was founded in Hillsboro, Oregon. Three years later, Murphy's Pizza chain began operating in Petaluma, California. Both chains were later acquired and consolidated by Terry Collins into Papa Murphy's. The chain was incorporated as Papa Murphy's International, Inc. In 2003, Papa Murphy's was voted "Best Pizza Chain in America" by Restaurants and Institutions Magazine. The company was merged with PMI Holdings, Inc. in 2004.

In 2010, the chain sold out to Lee Equity Partners of New York City. Sales for the chain totaled $702 million in 2011, which grew to $800 million in 2012 from 1,350 outlets. Reuters reported in 2013 that Papa Murphy's New York parent, Lee Equity Partners, was preparing a public offering for the take-and-bake pizza chain. Official plans for the IPO were announced in March 2014.

Papa Murphy's (FRSH) was added to the Nasdaq May 2, 2014, raising $64.1 million in shares.

Following a loss in the third quarter of 2016, the company announced that it would launch its first national advertising campaign in 2017.
 
By 2017–2018, the franchisor was struggling, dipping in and out of losses and profitability. In May 2019, it was taken over by Canadian private food conglomerate MTY Food Group, and removed from the NASDAQ.

In October 2022, Papa Murphy's was sued in a class action lawsuit alleging the company had been secretly wiretapping the private conversations of everyone who had communicated via the company's online chat feature.

Operations
Orders are available by walk-in, online order, or call-in. Some stores have a drive-thru window where customers can pick up call-in orders. As part of the take-and-bake concept, the pizzas are made at the store but are not baked there. According to Nation's Restaurant News, take-and-bake pizzerias typically have lower costs because they require less restaurant space and equipment. As a result, they are often able to undercut the national pizza giants. Papa Murphy's also offers salads, dessert items, and soft drinks in various sizes.

See also
 List of pizza chains of the United States

References

External links
 

Take and bake pizzerias
Pizza chains of the United States
Companies based in Vancouver, Washington
Restaurant chains in the United States
Restaurants in Washington (state)
Restaurants established in 1981
1981 establishments in Washington (state)
Companies formerly listed on the Nasdaq
2014 initial public offerings
2019 mergers and acquisitions
Pizza franchises
American subsidiaries of foreign companies